Giulia Elettra Gorietti (born 29 September 1988) is an Italian actress from Rome.

Life and career 
Gorietti was born in Rome from an Italian father and a German-Portuguese mother: at the age of 12 she joined the Italian Rhythmic gymnastics team, but she had to quit because of an accident.

She made her acting debut in 2003, with Caterina in the Big City, directed by Paolo Virzì, alongside Margherita Buy and Sergio Castellitto.
In the following years, she had main roles in movies by directors Leonardo Pieraccioni and
Luca Lucini, thus gaining a certain fame in Italy.

Filmography

Films 
 Caterina in the Big City, directed by Paolo Virzì (2003)
 Three Steps Over Heaven, directed by Luca Lucini (2004)
 L'uomo spezzato, directed by Stefano Calvagna (2005)
 I Love You in Every Language in the World, directed by Leonardo Pieraccioni (2005)
 Ho voglia di te, directed by Luis Prieto (2007)
 Ultimi della classe, directed by Luca Biglione (2008)
 Prigioniero di un segreto, directed by Carlo Fusco (2009)
 L'ultimo ultras, directed by Stefano Calvagna (2009)
 Suburra, directed by Stefano Sollima (2015)
 La cena di Natale, directed by Marco Ponti (2016)

TV 

 Le ali, directed by Andrea Porporati (2008)
 Bakhita, directed by Giacomo Campiotti (2009)
 L'amore che non dura, directed by Stefano Calvagna (2009)
 I liceali 3, directed by Francesco Miccichè and Massimiliano Papi (2010)
Terra Ribelle - Il Nuovo Mondo, directed by Ambrogio Lo Giudice (2012)

Short movies 

 La notte bianca, directed by Luca Lucini (2004)

Videoclips 

 Dalla pelle al cuore by Antonello Venditti, directed by Gaetano Morbioli (2007)
 Regali di Natale by Antonello Venditti, directed by Gaetano Morbioli (2007)
 I Keep Fallin' by NYLO, directed by Dave Depares (2011)

References

External links 
 Giulia Elettra Gorietti's official site
 

Italian film actresses
Living people
Actresses from Rome
1988 births
Italian television actresses
Italian people of German descent
Italian people of Portuguese descent
21st-century Italian actresses